Darkhan Kydyrali (born April 16, 1974) is a Kazakh scholar and writer, Doctor of Historical Sciences, professor. He is an academician of National Academy of Science Republic of Kazakhstan. From 2014 to August 31, 2022 Dr. Kydyrali President of the International Turkic Academy. Since July 2016 he has been working as chairman of the board of the Egemen Kazakhstan  national newspaper. He is a member of political bureau council of Nur Otan party. He has a first council diplomatic rank. On September 2, 2022, Darkhan Kydyrali was appointed Minister of information and social development of Kazakhstan.

Biography

Darkhan Kydyrali, born on April 16, 1974, in the Tulkibas district of the South Kazakhstan Region. He had studied at Al-Farabi Kazakh National University (Kazakhstan, 1991–1992), Marmara University (Turkey, 1992–1996), Dokuz Eylül University (Turkey, 1996–1997), Ege University (Turkey, 1997–1998), Istanbul University (Turkey, 1998–2001). He is a Corresponding Member of the Kazakhstan National Academy of Science (2017), Honorary Doctor of Azerbaijan National Academy of Sciences (2016), Honorary Doctor of Mongolian National Academy of Sciences (2017).

Career 
2001–2005 – Yassawi International Kazakh-Turkish University: research fellow, academic secretary, head of the department, chief of staff, senior research fellow
2003–2005 – senior research fellow of the Institute of Turkic Studies and "Bauyrzhantanu" Research Center
2005–2006 – associate professor, a senior research fellow at the Lev Gumilev Eurasian National University.
2006–2007 – deputy director of the Presidential Center of Culture of the Republic of Kazakhstan
2007–2008 – counsellor of the Minister of Education and Science of the Republic of Kazakhstan
2008–2009 – expert, head of sector at the Presidential Administration of Kazakhstan
2009–2012 – deputy press secretary of the President of the Republic of Kazakhstan
2012 - elected as the member of the executive board of the Union of writers of Kazakhstan
2012–2014 – deputy secretary-general of the Turkic Council
2014–2022 - president of the International Turkic Academy
2015–present - head of The Union of National Academies of Sciences of the Turkic World. Scientific projects organized under the direction of Darkhan Kydyrali: International cultural event "Korkyt Ata Heritage and the Turkic world" at the UNESCO headquarters in Paris (2015); International symposium "Synergy on the Silk Road and the Plan of 2030" at the UN headquarters in New York.
July 2016–present - chairman of the board of the "Egemen Kazakhstan" national newspaper
 From September 2018 to August 31, 2022, he was appointed President of the International Turkic Academy for a second term
September 2022 – Minister of information and social development of Kazakhstan

Works 
Mustafa Shokai. Ankara, 2001
Taraz tarihy. Taraz, 2005
Turyk halyktary adebiety tarihy. (collective volume) Turkestan, 2005
Mustafa Shokai. Astana, 2007
Ulyk Turkestan. Astana, 2008
Atymdy adam koigan son ... Astana, 2008
Zheruiyk. Аstana, 2009
Mustafa. Аstana, 2012

Awards 
 Recipient of the "Daryn" youth award (1998)
 Recipient of the Certificate of gratitude from the President of Kazakhstan and medals
 Laureate of the "Kultegin" award for high achievements in Turkic studies (2014)
 Recipient of the "For service to Turkic world" prize (2015)
 Recipient of the gold medal "For service to Turkic history and culture" awarded by the "New Turkey" Strategic Institute (2015)
 Laureate of the "Red Apple" award (2015)
 Recipient of the "20th anniversary of the Kazakhstan People Assembly" (2015) medal
 The Prize for outstanding service for the Turkic world (2016)
 An International Award "For service to the Turkic World" presented by the Silk Road Strategy research center and The Silk Road Magazine (2017)
 Hungarian Order of Merit (2017)
 Dostlug Order of Azerbaijan Republic (2017)
 Order of Parasat (2018)
 The Award pin "Aqparat Salasynyn Uzdigi" ("The Information Worker")

Additional links 
Scientific Integration of the Turkic World, Interview to the "Mysl'" (Thought) Magazine, December 23, 2014 (in Russian).
At the Heart of the “Greater Eurasia”, Interview to the "Kaspiy" (Caspian) Analytical Portal of Azerbaijan (in Russian).
Abay: The Leader of the Modernization Period in Turkestan, "Kardes Kalemler" (Brotherly Pens) International Magazine (in Turkish)

References

External links
https://www.facebook.com/darhan.hidirali

Ethnic Kazakh people
1974 births
Living people
Istanbul University alumni